Cicindela limbalis, the common claybank tiger beetle, is a species of tiger beetle. The beetle's back is reddish purple and sometimes may be dull green or brown. The species can commonly be found on steep, moist bare clay soil. The beetle can live for 3 years.

Distribution and habitat
Common claybank tiger beetles are found in North America. They are present in the Yukon (although they are not common, being recognized as critically imperiled/vulnerable there) and from the central Mackenzie River valley south through the Rockies and east across southern Canada to the Maritimes. They are also found in the United States of America in the Great Lakes region and New England. 

Their habitat is bare clay slopes, often on river banks.

References

limbalis
Beetles of North America
Beetles described in 1834
Taxa named by Johann Christoph Friedrich Klug